Josh Miller is the American Director of Product for the White House. Prior to that, he was a co-founder and CEO of Branch, which later sold to Facebook.

In high school, Josh was a finalist for a CNN Hero Award and a featured speaker at the Aspen Institute's Ideas Festival.

Miller is on leave from Princeton University, having completed three years before leaving to pursue a career in the technology industry.

References

Living people
Princeton University people
Year of birth missing (living people)